Jack Thibeau (born June 12, 1946) is an American film and television actor best known for playing the prisoner Clarence Anglin in the 1979 film Escape from Alcatraz. During his career, he frequently appeared in other movies that starred Clint Eastwood, such as Any Which Way You Can (1980), Sudden Impact (1983), and City Heat (1984).

Thibeau also played a number of characters in such films as 48 Hrs. (1982), The Hitcher (1986), Lethal Weapon (1987), and Action Jackson (1988). In addition Thibeau also appeared on such TV-series as Miami Vice, Sledge Hammer! and The Untouchables where he co-starred as Bugs Moran in a recurring role.

Filmography

Film

Television (selected)

References

External links
 

1946 births
Living people
American male film actors
American screenwriters
American television writers